James Hoch is an American poet.

Biography
The son of a teacher-coach and a saleswoman, Hoch grew up in Collingswood, New Jersey, with three older siblings. Hoch studied philosophy at Millersville University and graduated from University of Maryland with an MFA in creative writing/poetry.

He has taught at Franklin and Marshall College and Lynchburg College. He now teaches in the Salameno School of Humanities and Global Studies at Ramapo College in New Jersey. Prior to teaching, Hoch worked as a dishwasher, dock worker, cook, social worker, and shepherd.

Hoch's poems have appeared in American Poetry Review, Virginia Quarterly Review, The Washington Post, Antioch, Slate, The Kenyon Review, The Gettysburg Review, Ninth Letter, Carolina Quarterly, The Virginia Quarterly Review, New England Review, Pleiades, Black Warrior Review, Gettysburg, Five Fingers, and The New Republic.

He was the 2008 The Frost Place Poet in residence.

Personal life 
Hoch has lived in Lancaster, Pennsylvania; Takoma Park, Maryland; Charlottesville, Virginia; Pittsburgh, Pennsylvania; Albuquerque, New Mexico; Collingswood, New Jersey and Nyack, New York. He now resides Garrison, NY, with his wife and sons.

Awards
 Bread Loaf Writers' Conference fellowships
 Sewanee Writers' Conference fellowships
 Summer Literary Seminars fellowships
  Pennsylvania Council on the Arts Individual Artists Fellowship, 2002
 National Endowment for the Arts Literature Fellowship, 2007
 The Frost Place Poet in residence, 2008
 Gerald Cable Award, for A Parade of Hands

Bibliography 
Last Pawn Shop in New Jersey. LSU Press. 2022. ISBN 978-0807174050.
Radio Static. Green Linden Press. 2021. ISBN 978-1-7371625-2-0.

Notes

References

External links
 Poems by James Hoch in Blackbird: an online journal of literature and the arts in vol. 9, no. 1
 "James Hoch", Fishouse
"Night Crabbing", Blackbird, Fall 2005
"Soft Shells"; "Amorphophallus titanum, The Corpse Flower"; "The Color"; "Fulgurite", The Drunken Boat
"sound of a body falling off a bridge", cross connect
"The Farm in Coleraine", OK Review
"Late Autumn Wasp", poets.org
"Draft", Slate, Feb. 22, 2005
"Hinge", Slate, April 5, 2000

Year of birth missing (living people)
Living people
American male poets
People from Collingswood, New Jersey
People from Mahwah, New Jersey
Ramapo College faculty
University of Maryland, College Park alumni
People from Garrison, New York